Darryl Fitton (born 5 May 1962) is an English professional darts player. He is nicknamed The Dazzler and comes to the stage dancing to the Madness song "One Step Beyond" wearing sunglasses; one of the most popular walk-ons with the audience. Before embarking on a career in darts, Fitton worked as an undertaker.

Darts career
Fitton's first TV appearance was against Peter Manley in the 1997 PDC World Matchplay. However, he lost 8-6, and has not made another PDC appearance since.

Fitton debuted in the BDO World Championship in 2003 as a qualifier, but lost 1-3 to fellow qualifier John Burton in the first round. In 2004, he returned to Lakeside, again hitting a 180 score with his very first turn. He reached the quarter-finals before being beaten by Andy Fordham, who went on to win the title. The following year, he reached the semi-finals, this time losing out to Raymond van Barneveld in a hard-fought 5-3 scoreline, as van Barneveld went on to win the title that year. After that, Darryl did not win a match at the World Championship for the next two years, losing to Martin Adams and Phill Nixon in the first round of the 2006 and 2007 championships respectively. Fitton did reach the final of the Winmau World Masters in 2007, leading Robert Thornton 5-2 before Thornton hit back to win 7-5.

In the 2008 World Championship, Fitton got beyond the first round for the first time since 2005 when he bossed his match against Davy Richardson, running out a 3-1 winner with a 94.86 average. In the second round he put in one of the most dominant performances of the World Championship when he averaged over 100 in a 4-0 hammering of Gary Robson. However he lost 5-1 in the quarter-finals to number-one seed (and eventual champion) Mark Webster.

Darryl is known as a consistently high scorer, he once held the record for best average in a full, televised match. His 6-0 win against Davy Richardson in the 2004 International Darts League saw him hit a three-dart average of 114.15. This was, at the time, the highest three-dart average on a televised tournament.

Fitton reached the semi finals of the 2009 BDO World Championship, beating Mark Salmon in the first round and then defeated 12th seed Simon Whitlock in round two. He followed up with a 5-4 win over fourth seed Scott Waites before bowing out to his friend Tony O'Shea in a 6-4 defeat. Fitton then claimed the 2009 Dutch Open title, beating Willy van de Wiel in the final and then the Isle of Man Open title, beating World Champion Ted Hankey in the final.

Fitton won the 2009 Zuiderduin Masters beating Martin Adams in the final 5-2. He also achieved the magic nine dart finish against Ross Montgomery and was given £4,000 which he donated to a local Charity. In the 2010 BDO World Championship, he was beaten by eventual finalist Dave Chisnall 3-1 in the first round.

Fitton also lost in the first round at Lakeside in 2011, 3-0 against second seed Stuart Kellett winning just one leg. Fitton managed to retain some form later in the year by reaching his second Zuiderduin Masters final, where he narrowly lost to Scott Waites having had two darts to win. However, Fitton would once again lose in the first round at Lakeside in 2012 losing 3-1 against fourth seed Robbie Green.

After a quiet 2012 season, Fitton entered the 2013 BDO World Darts Championship as the 16th seed. He narrowly defeated Benito van de Pas 3-2 in the first round to secure his first win at Lakeside since 2009. He then caused a big upset by defeating top seed Stephen Bunting 4-2 in the second round. In the quarter-final, Fitton was defeated 5-2 by Wesley Harms. Fitton's form improved after this but his 2014 World Championship was ended in the first round by Tony Eccles, in Eccles's last tournament before being convicted of child grooming. The following year, Fitton reached the quarter-finals again beating previous year's runner-up Alan Norris en route, before losing to Glen Durrant.

In 2015, Fitton hit a nine-dart finish in the Dutch Open final against Martin Adams, although he ended up losing the match. He also reached the final of the Jersey Open losing to Scott Mitchell.

In the 2016 BDO World Darts Championship, seeded seventh, Fitton was defeated 3-2 in the first round by Dennis Harbour.

After that, he won the 2016 BDO World Trophy by defeating Peter Machin in the final 13-9. With this win, Fitton qualified for the 2016 Grand Slam of Darts

Fitton was knocked out of the 2018 BDO World Darts Championship in the second round, losing to Glen Durrant 4–1

PDC
Fitton confirmed on his Facebook his intention to switch to the Professional Darts Corporation for the 2018 season, and he entered the 2018 Q-School in an attempt to win a Tour Card.

BDO
He rejoined the British Darts Organisation and competed in the Dutch Open. He reached the last 16 and got beaten by Dave Parletti.

World Championship Results

BDO

WSDT
 2022: First round (lost to Richie Howson 2–3)
 2023: Quarter-finals (lost to Leonard Gates 1–3)

Career statistics

(W) Won; (F) finalist; (SF) semifinalist; (QF) quarterfinalist; (#R) rounds 6, 5, 4, 3, 2, 1; (RR) round-robin stage; (Prel.) Preliminary round; (DNQ) Did not qualify; (DNP) Did not participate; (NH) Not held

Performance timeline

BDO major finals: 4 (2 title, 2 runners-up)

Nine-dart finishes

High averages

Darryl Fitton's televised average of 114.15 was the world record until Phil Taylor broke it at the 2008 UK Open.

References

External links
 Darryl Fitton's Official Website
 Profile and stats on Darts Database

Living people
1962 births
English darts players
British Darts Organisation players
Darts players who have thrown televised nine-dart games